Saint-Gilles (Provençal: Sant Geli) or Saint-Gilles-du-Gard is a commune in the Gard department in southern France.

It is the second most populous commune in the Nîmes metropolitan area.

History
The abbey of Saint-Gilles was founded during the seventh century traditionally by the hermit Saint Giles (Latin Ægidius), whose relics the abbey possessed. The commune formed around the nucleus of the abbey, which was the first stopping point for pilgrims bound for Santiago de Compostela in Spain, who were following the via Tolosana that led from Arles to Toulouse and crossed the Pyrenees to join other routes at Puente La Reina, thence to Santiago along the Via Compostelana. The former abbey church was listed in 1998 among the UNESCO World Heritage Sites, as part of the Routes of Santiago de Compostela in France. The abbey church's west portal is among the most beautiful of the great Romanesque portals and a definitive example of the Provençal Romanesque. The church has three naves and a famed spiral staircase of cantilevered stone steps (in the now destroyed part of the church). During the French Wars of Religion the Protestants fortified themselves within the abbey, which was severely damaged.

The shrine of Saint Gilles, located in the crypt of the church, is the subject of pilgrimage in particular by women wishing to become pregnant or dealing with infertility.

Saint-Gilles was the birthplace of Guy Foulques, Pope Clement IV (died 1268), whose natal house is now a museum of the archaeology, ethnology and ornithology of the Camargue.

Saint-Gilles is more recently the birthplace of the author Georges-Jean Arnaud (born 1928).

Geography
Saint-Gilles is located at the northern edge of the Petite Camargue, between Arles (15 km) and Nîmes (16 km). With a land area of 153.73 km² (59.355 sq mi), it is rather large by continental French standards, although many of the communes in this part of France are among the largest in area in Metropolitan France.

Population

Transportation
The Nîmes-Alès-Camargue-Cévennes Airport, sometimes called Garons Airport, is located on the territory of the commune.

Notable people
Abba Mari ben Isaac of St Gilles

See also
 Communes of the Gard department
 Costières de Nîmes AOC

References

Further reading
 Whitney S. Stoddard, 1973. The Façade of Saint-Gilles-du-Gard: Its Influence on French Sculpture (Wesleyan University Press,)

External links

 Official website 
 Official town hall website  the other
 Pictures of the abbey church
 More pictures of the abbey church
 The West Portal of the Abbey of Saint-Gilles A tinted plaster caste at the Carnegie Museum, Pittsburgh.
 virtual Tours #1:St. Gilles-du-Gard
  Regordane Info - The independent portal for The Regordane Way or St Gilles Trail The Regordane finishes in Saint-Gilles. (in English and French)

Communes of Gard
World Heritage Sites in France